"Can't Wait" is the second single released from Redman's second album, Dare Iz a Darkside. It is produced by Erick Sermon and Redman, and contains samples from "All Night Long" by Mary Jane Girls, "Caribbean Nights" by Bob James and "Just Rhymin' With Biz" by Big Daddy Kane and Biz Markie.

The song reached number five on Hot Dance Music/Maxi-Singles Sales charts, number eleven on the Hot Rap Singles chart, number sixty one on the Hot R&B/Hip-Hop Singles & Tracks chart and number ninety-four on the Billboard Hot 100 chart. It is the first of four Redman songs to reach the Billboard Hot 100 chart.

In a March 2012 interview with Complex, Erick Sermon mentioned producer Mike City used the production of Redman's "Can't Wait" as the inspiration behind two of his hits- "I Wish" by Carl Thomas as well as "Full Moon" by singer/actress Brandy.

Single track list

A-side
 Can't Wait (LP version) (3:43)
 Can't Wait (clean version) (3:53)

B-side
 A Million And 1 Buddah Spots (LP version) (3:23)
 Can't Wait (instrumental) (3:40)
 Can't Wait (Acapella) (3:50)

References

1995 singles
Redman (rapper) songs
Song recordings produced by Erick Sermon
Def Jam Recordings singles
Hardcore hip hop songs
Funk-rap songs
1994 songs
Black-and-white music videos
Songs written by Erick Sermon
Songs written by Rick James
Songs written by Big Daddy Kane
Songs written by Redman (rapper)